Emma Flash Ankudey (born 10 September 1943) is a Ghanaian former amateur boxer.

Ankudey won a gold medal in the welterweight division of the boxing at the 1970 British Commonwealth Games, which were held in Edinburgh.

At the 1972 Summer Olympics, Ankudey represented Ghana in the welterweight competition. He was eliminated in round two by Mongolia's Damdinjavyn Bandi.

References

External links
Emma Ankudey at Sports Reference

1943 births
Living people
Ghanaian male boxers
Olympic boxers of Ghana
Boxers at the 1972 Summer Olympics
Commonwealth Games gold medallists for Ghana
Commonwealth Games medallists in boxing
Boxers at the 1970 British Commonwealth Games
Welterweight boxers
Medallists at the 1970 British Commonwealth Games